Timothy Drew, better known as Noble Drew Ali (January 8, 1886 – July 20, 1929) founded the Moorish Science Temple of America. Considered a prophet by his followers, in 1913 he founded the Canaanite Temple in Newark, New Jersey, before relocating to Chicago, where he gained a following of thousands of converts. Following the murder of a rival Moorish Science Temple leader, Drew Ali was arrested (but never charged) and sent to jail; he died in 1929 shortly after being released.

Early life 
Several details of Drew Ali's early life are uncertain, as true information became mixed with that of legend by his devout followers. He is believed to have been born Timothy Drew, on January 8, 1886, in North Carolina. Sources differ as to his background and upbringing: one reports he was the orphaned son of two former slaves born in a Cherokee tribe, while another describes him as the son of John A. Drew-Quitman, military and political leader of the Cherokee (Coharie) Nation and Eliza Turner-Quitman full blooded Washitaw-Tunica mother.

One version of his life, common among members of the Moorish Science Temple, holds that Drew was raised by an abusive aunt, who once threw him into a furnace. This version holds that he left home at 16 and joined a band of Romani people who took him overseas to Egypt, and the Middle East. Drew Ali also reportedly worked as a circus magician, or a merchant seaman, before purportedly traveling to Egypt. He never received a formal education, but at some point came into contact with Eastern philosophy.

In 2014, a completely different understanding of Drew Ali's early life was presented with the publication of an article in the online Journal of Race Ethnicity and Religion. The article presented newly compiled evidence, including census records, newspaper ads, newspaper articles, a World War I draft card, and street directory records, to link Noble Drew Ali to one "Thomas Drew," who was born on the same date as "Timothy Drew" but originated from Virginia instead.

Religious formation 
Drew Ali reported that during his travels in Egypt, he met a high priest of Egyptian magic. In one version of Drew Ali's biography, the leader saw him as a reincarnation of the founder. In others, he claims that the priest considered him a reincarnation of Jesus, the Buddha, Muhammad and other religious prophets. According to the biography, the high priest trained Ali in mysticism and gave him a "lost section" of the Quran.

This text came to be known as the Holy Koran of the Moorish Science Temple of America (not to be confused with the Islamic Quran). It is also known as the "Circle Seven Koran" because of its cover, which features a red "7" surrounded by a blue circle. The first 19 chapters are from The Aquarian Gospel of Jesus the Christ, published in 1908 by esoteric Ohio preacher Levi Dowling. In The Aquarian Gospel, Dowling described Jesus's supposed travels in India, Egypt, and Palestine during the years of his life which are not accounted for by the New Testament.

Chapters 20 through 45 are borrowed from the Rosicrucian work, Unto Thee I Grant, with minor changes in style and wording. They are instructions on how to live, and the education and duties of adherents.

Drew Ali wrote the last four chapters of the Circle Seven Koran himself. In these he wrote:

Drew Ali used this material to claim Jesus and his followers were Asiatic. ("Asiatic" was the term Drew Ali used for all dark or olive-colored people); he labeled whites as European, although he labeled whites who became a part of the MSTA as "Persians" or "Celts". He suggested that all Asiatics should be allied.

Drew Ali believed that African Americans were all Moors, who he claimed were descended from the ancient Moabites (describing them as belonging to Northwest Africa as opposed to Moab as the name suggests). He claimed that Islam and its teachings are more beneficial to their earthly salvation, and that their 'true nature' had been 'withheld' from them. Male members of the Temple wear a fez or turban as head covering; women wear a turban.

As Drew Ali began urging the "Moorish-Americans" to become better citizens, he made speeches like, "A Divine Warning By the Prophet for the Nations", in which he urged them to reject derogatory labels, such as "Black," "colored," and "Negro." He urged Americans of all races to reject hate and embrace love. He believed that Chicago would become a second Mecca.

Drew Ali crafted Moorish Science ideology from a variety of sources, a "network of alternative spiritualities that focused on the power of the individual to bring about personal transformation through mystical knowledge of the divine within". In the interwar period in Chicago and other major cities, he used these concepts to preach Moorish pride. His approach appealed to thousands of African Americans who had left severely oppressive conditions in the South through the Great Migration and faced struggles adapting in new urban environments.

Founding the Moorish Science Temple 

It is possible that Drew Ali did actually travel to Egypt and Morocco, but historians believe that after leaving North Carolina, he moved to Newark, New Jersey, where he worked as a train expressman. In 1913, Drew Ali formed the Canaanite Temple in Newark. Drew Ali and his followers migrated, while planting congregations in Philadelphia; Washington, D.C., and Detroit. Finally, Drew Ali settled in Chicago in 1925, saying the Midwest was "closer to Islam." The following year he officially registered Temple No. 9.

There he instructed followers not to be confrontational but to build up their people to be respected. In this way, they might take their place in the United States of America by developing a cultural identity that was congruent with Drew Ali's beliefs on personhood. In the late 1920s, journalists estimated the Moorish Science Temple had 35,000 members in 17 temples in cities across the Midwest and upper South.

The ushers of the Temple wore black fezzes. The leader of a particular temple was known as a Grand Sheik, or Governor. Noble Drew Ali was known to have had several wives.  According to The Chicago Defender, he claimed the power to marry and divorce at will. The Moorish Science movement was reportedly studied and watched by the Chicago police.

Drew Ali attended the 1929 inauguration of Illinois Governor Louis Lincoln Emmerson. The Chicago Defender stated that his trip included "interviews with many distinguished citizens from Chicago, who greeted him on every hand." With the growth in its population and membership, Chicago was established as the center of the Moorish Science movement.

Internal split and murder 
In early 1929, following a conflict over funds, Claude Green-Bey, the business manager of Chicago Temple No. 1 split from the Moorish Science Temple of America. He declared himself Grand Sheik and took a number of members with him. On March 15, Green-Bey was stabbed to death at the Unity Hall of the Moorish Science Temple, on Indiana Avenue in Chicago.

Drew Ali was out of town at the time, as he was dealing with former Supreme Grand Governor Lomax-Bey (professor Ezaldine Muhammad), who had supported Green-Bey's attempted coup. When Drew Ali returned to Chicago, the police arrested him and other members of the community on suspicion of having instigated the killing. No indictment was sworn for Drew Ali at that time.

Death 
Shortly after his release by the police, Drew Ali died at age 43 at his home in Chicago on July 20, 1929. Although the exact circumstances of his death are unknown, the Certificate of Death stated that Noble Drew Ali died from "tuberculosis broncho-pneumonia".  Despite the official report, many of his followers speculated that his death was caused by injuries from the police or from other members of the faith.

Others thought it was due to pneumonia. One Moor told The Chicago Defender that "The Prophet was not ill; his work was done and he laid his head upon the lap of one of his followers and passed out." His funeral took place on July 25, 1929, with hundreds attending. The services were held at the Pythian Temple in Chicago, followed by the burial at Burr Oak Cemetery in nearby Alsip.

The death of Drew Ali brought out a number of candidates who vied to succeed him. Edward Mealy El stated that he had been declared Drew Ali's successor by Drew Ali himself, while John Givens-El, Drew Ali's chauffeur, declared that he was Drew Ali reincarnated. However, the governors of the Moorish Science Temple of America declared Charles Kirkman-Bey to be the successor to Drew Ali and named him Grand Advisor.

Legacy 
Wallace Fard Muhammad, the founder of Nation of Islam, was previously a prominent member of the Moorish Science Temple of America, where he was known as David Ford-El. After Drew Ali's death, he claimed to be the Prophet reincarnated.

When his leadership was largely rejected, he broke away from the Moorish Science Temple, moved to Detroit, and founded the Nation of Islam. Nation of Islam leaders denied any historical connection to the Moorish Science Temple of America, until February 26, 2014, when Louis Farrakhan acknowledged Noble Drew Ali's contribution to the Nation of Islam.

In 1986, the Moroccan Ambassador to the United States officially recognized the Moorish Science Temple's Islamic linkage to Morocco through Drew Ali.

See also 
 Islam in the United States
 Liberation theology
 Malcolm X
 Elijah Muhammad
 Religion of black Americans

Notes and references

Notes

References 
 Ali, Noble Prophet Drew (1928), Holy Koran of the Moorish Science Temple of America
 Abdat, Fathie Ali (2014) "Before the Fez- Life and Times of Drew Ali 1886–1924", Journal of Race, Ethnicity and Religion, 5: 1–39.
 Abu Shouk, Ahmed I. (1997) "A Sudanese Missionary to the United States", Sudanic Africa, 9:137–191.
 Ahlstrom, Sydney E. (2004) A Religious History of the American People, 2nd ed., Yale University Press, .
 Blakemore, Jerome; Yolanda Mayo; Glenda Blakemore (2006) "African-American and Other Street Gangs: A Quest of Identity (Revisted)", Human Behavior in the Social Environment from an African-American Perspective,  Letha A. See, ed., The Haworth Press .
 Chicago Defender (1929) "Drew Ali, 'Prophet' of Moorish Cult, Dies Suddenly", July 27, 1929, page 1.
 Chicago Tribune (May 1929) "Cult Head Took Too Much Power, Witnesses Say", May 14, 1929.
 Chicago Tribune (September 1929) "Seize 60 After So. Side Cult Tragedy", September 26, 1929, p. 1.
 Gale Group, "Timothy Drew", Religious Leaders of America, 2nd ed., 1999, Biography Resource Center. Farmington Hills, Mich.: Thomson Gale, 2007.
 Gardell, Mattias (1996) In the Name of Elijah Muhammad. Duke University Press, .
 
 Gomez, Michael A. (2005) Black Crescent: The Experience and Legacy of African Muslims in the Americas, Cambridge University Press, .
 Hamm, Mark S.  (2007)  Terrorist Recruitment in American Correctional Institutions: An Exploratory Study of Non-Traditional Faith Groups Final Report, U.S. Department of Justice, December 2007, Document No.: 220957.
 The Hartford Courant  (1930) "Religious Cult Head Sentenced For Murder", April 19, 1930, p. 20.
 Lippy, Charles H. (2006)  Faith in America: Changes, Challenges, New Directions, Praeger Publishers, .
 Main, Frank (2006) Chicago Sun-Times, June 25, 2006, p. A03.
 McCloud, Aminah (1994) African American Islam, Routledge.
 Miyakawa, Felicia M. (2005) Five Percenter Rap: God Hop's Music, Message, and Black Muslim Mission, Indiana University Press, Bloomington, Indiana, .
 Nance, Susan. (2002) "Respectability and Representation: The Moorish Science Temple, Morocco and Black Public Culture in 1920s Chicago", American Quarterly 54, no.  4 (December): 623–659.
 Nash, Jay Robert (1993) World Encyclopedia of Organized Crime, Da Capo Press, .
 Nashashibi, Rami (2007) "The Blackstone Legacy, Islam, and the Rise of Ghetto Cosmopolitanism", Souls, Volume 9, Issue 2 April 2007, pages 123–131.
 Paghdiwala, Tasneem (2007), "The Aging of the Moors", Chicago Reader, November 15, 2007, Vol 37 No 8.
 Perkins, William Eric (1996) Droppin' Science: Critical Essays on Rap Music and Hip Hop Culture, Temple University Press.
 Prashad, Vijay (2002) Everybody Was Kung Fu Fighting: Afro-Asian Connections and the Myth of Cultural Purity, Beacon Press, .
 Scopino Jr., A. J. (2001) "Moorish Science Temple of America", in Organizing Black America: An Encyclopedia of African American Associations, Nina Mjagkij, ed., Garland Publishing, p. 346.
 Shipp, E.R. (1985) "Chicago Gang Sues to Be Recognized as Religion", New York Times, Dec 27, 1985, p. A14.
 Turner, Richard Brent (2003) Islam in the African-American Experience, Indiana University Press, .
 The Washington Post (1929), "Three Deaths Laid to Fanatical Plot", September 27, 1929, p. 2.
 Wilson, Peter Lamborn (1993) Sacred Drift: Essays on the Margins of Islam, City Lights Books, .

Place of birth unknown
1886 births
1929 deaths
African-American activists
19th-century Islamic religious leaders
20th-century deaths from tuberculosis
20th-century Islamic religious leaders
Activists from North Carolina
Activists from New Jersey
Activists from Illinois
African-American Muslims
African-American religious leaders
American circus performers
American Muslim activists
American railroaders
Burials at Burr Oak Cemetery
Converts to Islam
Cult leaders
Deaths from bronchopneumonia
Founders of new religious movements
Members of the Moorish Science Temple of America
Moorish Science Temple of America
People from North Carolina
Prophecy in Islam
Prophets
Religious leaders from Chicago
Religion in Newark, New Jersey
Tuberculosis deaths in Illinois
Deaths from pneumonia in Illinois